The Rose, Vol. 2 is a 2005 posthumous album of Tupac Shakur's poetry. This album features recordings of Tupac's poetry in musical form, by other well-known artists such as Ludacris and Bone Thugs n Harmony. Tupac's poems are quoted, sung or simply used as inspiration for each track on this album. This is the second Tupac album containing poetry that has been released; the first, The Rose that Grew from Concrete, contains Tupac's poems being read and sung by other musical performers.

Track listing

External links 

Compilation albums published posthumously
2005 compilation albums
Tupac Shakur compilation albums
Sequel albums
Amaru Entertainment albums